Gluta curtisii is a species of plant in the family Anacardiaceae. It is a tree found in Peninsular Malaysia and Borneo.  
Any contact with this plant causes severe rash symptoms.

References

curtisii
Trees of Peninsular Malaysia
Trees of Borneo
Flora of Sarawak
Least concern plants
Taxonomy articles created by Polbot